Abdelfettah Mouddani (born 30 July 1956) is a Moroccan football goalkeeper who played for Morocco in the 1986 FIFA World Cup. He also played for KAC Kenitra.

References

External links
FIFA profile

1956 births
Moroccan footballers
Morocco international footballers
Association football goalkeepers
KAC Kénitra players
Botola players
1986 FIFA World Cup players
Living people